Muhammad Addeen Idrakie Bin Bahtiar (born 5 January 1994 in Kuala Lumpur), known as Addeen Idrakie, is a Malaysian professional squash player. As of February 2018, he was ranked number 111 in the world.

References

External links 
 Muhammad Addeen Idrakie Bin Bahtiar at SRAM
  
 

1994 births
Living people
Malaysian male squash players
Southeast Asian Games medalists in squash
Southeast Asian Games gold medalists for Malaysia
Southeast Asian Games silver medalists for Malaysia
Competitors at the 2015 Southeast Asian Games
Competitors at the 2017 Southeast Asian Games
Competitors at the 2019 Southeast Asian Games
21st-century Malaysian people